Roswell (also known as Roswell: The U.F.O. Cover-Up) is a 1994 television film produced by Paul Davids based on a supposedly true story about the Roswell UFO incident, the alleged U.S. military capture of a flying saucer and its alien crew following a crash near the town of Roswell, New Mexico, in July 1947.  Along with the Roswell crash, the film references prominent UFOlogy events such as Area 51, alien autopsies, the death of James Forrestal and Majestic-12.

The script was based on the book UFO Crash at Roswell, by Kevin D. Randle and Donald R. Schmitt.

Plot
Beginning at a 30-year reunion for members of the 509th Operations Group, flashbacks are presented that follow the attempts of Major Jesse Marcel to discover the truth about strange debris found on a local rancher's field in July 1947. Told by his superiors that what he has found is nothing more than a downed weather balloon, Marcel maintains his military duty until the weight of the truth, however out of this world it may be, forces him to piece together what really occurred.

Reception
The New York Times reviewed the film as a tense drama, maintaining "an engrossing course."  Criticizing the conspiracy aspect, it's noted that "What prevents this professionally fashioned hokum from being a high flier is the annoying question of how a cover-up that involved hundreds or thousands of people could have been maintained for 30 years or even 30 seconds in this expose-prone society."

Variety labeled it "a gripping fictional account."  The review concludes, "Wherever the truths of the Roswell incident may lie, director Kagan paces his story convincingly and, in the suspicions it raises about American military mendacity, unflinchingly: superior made-for-TV fare, in other words.  The extraterrestrial bodies, by the way, are terrific." (

The Los Angeles Times considered the film "no mere sci-fi hardware yarn," adding "Roswell is not so much a space odyssey but the story of a man's lost soul, that of an Air Force intelligence officer doggedly searching for the truth."

Cast
 Kyle MacLachlan as Jesse A. Marcel
 Martin Sheen as Townsend
 Dwight Yoakam as Mac Brazel
 Xander Berkeley as Sherman Carson
 Bob Gunton as Frank Joyce
 Kim Greist as Vy Marcel
 Peter MacNicol as Lewis Rickett
 John M. Jackson as Colonel Blanchard
 Nick Searcy as Mortician
 J.D. Daniels as Young Jesse Marcel, Jr.
 Charles Hallahan as Older Pilot MacIntire
 Ray McKinnon as Deputy Joe Pritchard
 Eugene Roche as James Forrestal
 Charles Martin Smith as Sheriff Wilcox
 Doug Wert as Older Jesse Marcel, Jr.
 Cynthia Allison as TV commentator
 Hoke Howell as Bar veteran
 Bruce Ed Morrow as General
 Will Huston as Alien clown (as William Edwards)
 Layne Beamer as Soldier
 Max Trumpower as Gate Guard
 Mik Scriba as Air Mechanic
 Matt Landers as Lt. Walter Haut
 George Gray III as Deputy
 Stephen C. Foster as Gate MP
 Dave Adams as Provost Marshal
 Bill Cook as Jeep Driver
 J.W. 'Corkey' Fornof as Pilot
 Charles Beck as Pilot
 Randy Gagne as Pilot
 Charles M. Kistler as Interrogator #1
 Daiton Rutkowski as Interrogator #2
 F. William Parker as Older Stanton
 Jonathan Mincks as Younger Stanton
 Peter Radon as Melvin Brown
 Gary Bullock as Eavesdropper
 Jim Hayne as Harris
 Mark Phelan as Gate Guard
 Steve Lanza as Outside Doctor
 Arthur Kopit as Inside Doctor
 Michael Strasser as Hospital MP
 Don Fischer as Outdoor MP
 Denice Marcel as Waitress
 Brandey Martinez as Waitress #2
 Lisa Waltz as Janet Foss
 John Mahon as Red Hat Vet
 Stanley Grover as Straw Hat Vet
 Warren Munson as Yellow Hat Vet
 Hansford Rowe as Chaplain
 Richard Fancy as Doctor
 Paul Davids as Photographer
 Philip Baker Hall as Roswell General
 Lawrence Dobkin as General (as Larry Dobkin)
 Edward Penn as Civilian Advisor
 Arthur Hiller as Scientist #1
 Parley Baer as Civilian Advisor
 Bruce Gray as Admiral

References/Links

External links

1994 films
1994 television films
Films based on non-fiction books
Roswell incident in fiction
Films set in 1947
Films set in 1977
Films set in New Mexico
Films set in Texas
Films directed by Jeremy Kagan
Films scored by Elliot Goldenthal
UFO-related television
1990s English-language films
American television films